Ivan Vasilev Dyulgerov (born 15 July 1999)  is a Bulgarian professional footballer who plays as a goalkeeper for Cherno More.

Career
A product of Cherno More's academy, Dyulgerov joined the first team as third choice goalkeeper in January 2016, following the departure of Iliya Nikolov. He made his league debut for Cherno More in a 3–1 away win over Neftochimic Burgas on 19 March 2017, playing the full 90 minutes. In the first half, he was booked for a foul against Ivan Valchanov in the penalty area, but he saved Galin Ivanov's penalty. Subsequently, Dyulgerov won the Man of the match award.

International career
Dyulgerov was called-up for the Bulgaria U18 squad for a friendly against Georgia U19 on 11 June 2017. He made his debut coming on as substitute for Dimitar Sheytanov. On 12 September 2017, Dyulgerov made his debut for Bulgaria U19 in a friendly against Bosnia and Herzegovina U19.

Dyulgerov made his debut for the Bulgarian under-21 team on 22 March 2019 in the starting eleven for the friendly against Northern Ireland U21.

Career statistics

Club

References

External links

1999 births
Living people
Bulgarian footballers
Bulgaria youth international footballers
Association football goalkeepers
First Professional Football League (Bulgaria) players
PFC Cherno More Varna players
Sportspeople from Varna, Bulgaria